ZPF may refer to:
 Quiatoni Zapotec, a Zapotec language of Mexico
 Waco ZPF, an American biplane
 Zero-point field